Deborah J. Donnell is a New Zealand and American biostatistician known for her research on the prevention of HIV infection. She is a professor in the Vaccine and Infectious Disease Division and Public Health Sciences Division of the Fred Hutchinson Cancer Research Center, and an affiliate professor of global health and health services at the University of Washington.

Education and career
Donnell earned bachelor's and master's degrees at the University of Auckland in 1980 and 1982, respectively, before coming to the US as a Fulbright Scholar and completing her Ph.D. in 1987 at the University of Washington.

Recognition
Donnell was named a Fellow of the American Association for the Advancement of Science in 2020, in the statistics section of the AAAS, "for distinguished contributions to the field of HIV prevention research, particularly for design and analysis of clinical trials of pre-exposure prophylaxis and treatment as prevention".

References

External links

Year of birth missing (living people)
Living people
American statisticians
New Zealand statisticians
Women statisticians
Biostatisticians
HIV/AIDS researchers
University of Auckland alumni
University of Washington alumni
Fellows of the American Association for the Advancement of Science
Fred Hutchinson Cancer Research Center people